Balczewo  is a village in the administrative district of Gmina Inowrocław, within Inowrocław County, Kuyavian-Pomeranian Voivodeship, in north-central Poland.

History
During the German occupation of Poland (World War II), the local forest was the site of a massacre of 27 Poles from Żnin, perpetrated by the Germans in December 1939, as part of the Intelligenzaktion.

References

Villages in Inowrocław County
Nazi war crimes in Poland